Abraham Foxall (8 November 1874 – 1950) was an English footballer who played as a striker.

References

English footballers
Arsenal F.C. players
Liverpool F.C. players
English Football League players
1874 births
1950 deaths
Association football forwards